Cornea verticillata, also called  vortex keratopathy or whorl keratopathy, is a condition characterised by corneal deposits at the level of the basal epithelium forming a faint golden-brown whorl pattern.  It is seen in Fabry disease or in case of prolonged amiodarone intake.


Presentation
No ocular complaints or visual difficulty is usually present.

Pathophysiology
This keratopathy is probably a type of drug-induced lipidosis.

Diagnosis

References

Medical signs
Disorders of sclera and cornea